Cladognathus is a genus of beetles of the family Lucanidae.

 Names brought to synonymy
 Cladognathus elegans is a synonym for Digonophorus elegans

References

External links 

 Cladognathus at insectoid.info

Lucanidae genera
Lucaninae